The Kissimmee City Street Railway Company was incorporated by Florida state law chapter 3659, approved February 12, 1885.  
It was established to create and run public transport using street railroads.
The law stated "beginning at such place, within the town of Kissimmee City, as the said company, by its President and Board of Directors, may determine, running thence through and on such streets and highways within said town, the Mayor and Board of Aldermen of said Kissimmee City may determine."
It was created as owned by John M. Bryan, C. A Carson, M. C. Osborne, John M. Lee, Andrew J. Rose, L. P. Hughey, W. A. Patrick, N. C. Bryan, T. A. Bass, E. N. Fell, and W. B. M. Davidson.

References

External links 
List of railroads incorporated in Florida; Bonds (Hometown Currency Virtual Museum)

Defunct Florida railroads
Florida street railroads
Defunct public transport operators in the United States
Kissimmee, Florida
Transportation in Osceola County, Florida
1885 establishments in Florida